From the Ground Up is the major-label debut album by all-female rock band Antigone Rising. It was released on the Starbucks-owned label Hear Music on May 11, 2005 as part of a promotional deal with Starbucks, where the album was sold exclusively until September 13, 2005. It was the first album to be released as part of the "Hear Music Debut" series, which highlights new and emerging artists.

Recording
From the Ground Up was recorded live in front of a small audience of fans.

Commercial performance
From the Ground Up had sold 31,000 copies at Starbucks alone, as of June 6, 2005. It debuted at No. 93 on the Billboard Comprehensive Albums Chart.

Track listing
All songs written by Kristen Henderson, except where noted.
	"Hello" 	3:17
	"Waiting, Watching, Wishing" (Chris Trapper)	4:43
	"She's Not Innocent"	3:31
	"Open Hearts & Doors"	4:32
	"Michael"	4:13
	"What?"	4:14
	"Happy Home"	3:21
	"Longshot"	4:15
	"Don't Look Back"	4:27
	"Better"	4:25
	"She Lived Here"	4:47
	"You're The Reason"	3:10
	"Rosita"	4:30
	"Broken"      6:11

Charts

Personnel
Cassidy - lead vocals
Cathy Henderson - guitars
Kristen Henderson - guitars 
Dena Tauriello - drums 
Jen Zielenbach - bass guitar

References

2005 debut albums
Hear Music albums
Lava Records albums